The Bandhmati are a Muslim community found in the state of Uttar Pradesh in India.

Origin 

The Muslim Bandhmati are Muslim converts from the Hindu Bandhmati caste.  In Hindi, the word bandhmati literally means a manufacturer of ropes. The exact circumstances to their conversion to Islam are unclear, with a number of differing traditions. One relate to conversion at the hand of the Sufi preacher Syed Salar Masud, who is buried in Bahraich. The community is concentrated in Saharanpur District, and also found in the other districts of the Doab region of western Uttar Pradesh. They speak Urdu among themselves, and Hindi with outsiders.

Present circumstances 

The Bandhmati are sub-divided into three endogamous groups, the Bhishti, Faqir and Karach. Historically these three groups were strictly endogamous, but this is no longer the case. Like other Muslim communities of the Doab, they are undergoing a process of Islamization, and this has led to the abandonment of clan exogamy. Marriages now occur within close kin, and they practice both parallel-cousin and cross-cousin marriages.  The Bandhmati are Sunni Muslims, although they still incorporate many folk beliefs. Some pre-Islamic Hindu ceremonies survive, such as the mundane ceremony.

The traditional occupation of the Bandhmati remains the manufacture of rope. But like other Muslim artisan communities, they have seen a decline in their traditional occupation. Many have taken to raising poultry; a few are now small-scale farmers. Others have immigrated to towns like Saharanpur, where they are now daily wage labourers.  Like other Muslim artisans groupings, they have a caste association, which deals with intra community disputes, and acts as an instrument of social control.

See also 

 Bandhmati

References 

Social groups of Uttar Pradesh
Muslim communities of Uttar Pradesh
Muslim communities of India